Carl Francis Zoll (January 29, 1899 – October 19, 1973) was an American football guard for the Green Bay Packers of the National Football League (NFL). He was a member of the first Packers' season in 1919. His career ended after the 1922 season. He was also the brother of teammate Martin Zoll and future-Packer Dick Zoll.

References
Birth of a Team and a Legend
1919-1920 Green Bay Packers

Carl Zoll's obituary

1899 births
1973 deaths
Players of American football from Wisconsin
Green Bay Packers players
People from Howard, Wisconsin
Sportspeople from Green Bay, Wisconsin